Steffen Döring (born 4 October 1960) is a German speed skater. He competed in two events at the 1980 Winter Olympics.

References

1960 births
Living people
German male speed skaters
Olympic speed skaters of East Germany
Speed skaters at the 1980 Winter Olympics
Speed skaters from Berlin